Nathaniel Borden may refer to:

Nate Borden (1932–1992), American footballer
Nathaniel B. Borden (1801–1865), U.S. politician